The Arizona Diamondbacks' 2012 season, was the franchise's 15th season in Major League Baseball and also their fifteenth season at Chase Field. The Diamondbacks finished with a record of 81–81, third place in the NL West.

Offseason

Right-handed pitchers Trevor Cahill and Takashi Saito were all acquired by the D-Backs in the offseason, along with slugging left-handed left fielder Jason Kubel and left-handed reliever Craig Breslow.

Regular season

NL West standings

NL Wild Card

Record vs. opponents

Roster

Game log

|-  style="text-align:center; background: #bfb;"
| 1 || April 6 || Giants || 5–4 || Kennedy (1–0) || Lincecum (0–1) || Putz (1) || 49,130 || 1–0
|-  style="text-align:center; background: #bfb;"
| 2 || April 7 || Giants || 5–4 || Hudson (1–0) || Bumgarner (0–1) || Putz (2) || 34,789 ||  2–0
|-  style="text-align:center; background: #bfb;"
| 3 || April 8 || Giants || 7–6 || Miley (1–0) || Affeldt (0–1) || Shaw (1) || 24,193 || 3–0
|-  style="text-align:center; background: #bfb;"
| 4 || April 10 || @ Padres || 4–2 (11) || Breslow (1–0) || Owings (0–1) || Putz (3) || 18,652 || 4–0
|-  style="text-align:center; background: #fbb;"
| 5 || April 11 || @ Padres || 1–2 || Frieri (1–0) || Hernandez (0–1) || Street (1) || 16,091 || 4–1
|-  style="text-align:center; background: #bfb;"
| 6 || April 12 || @ Padres || 3–1 || Kennedy (2–0) || Owings (0–2) || Putz (4) || 20,858 ||  5–1
|-  style="text-align:center; background: #fbb;"
| 7 || April 13 || @ Rockies || 6–7 || Brothers (1–1) || Shaw (0–1) || Betancourt (2) || 30,642 || 5–2
|-  style="text-align:center; background: #fbb;"
| 8 || April 14 || @ Rockies || 7–8 || Chatwood (1–0) || Putz (0–1) || || 29,856 || 5–3
|-  style="text-align:center; background: #bfb;"
| 9 || April 15 || @ Rockies || 5–2 || Cahill (1–0) || Pomeranz (0–1) || Shaw (2) || 26,952 || 6–3
|-  style="text-align:center; background: #bfb;"
| 10 || April 16 || Pirates || 5–1 || Saunders (1–0) || Bédard (0–3) || || 17,366 || 7–3
|-  style="text-align:center; background: #fbb;"
| 11 || April 17 || Pirates || 4–5 || Grilli (1–1) ||  Shaw (0–2) || Cruz (1) || 19,198 || 7–4
|-  style="text-align:center; background: #fbb;"
| 12 || April 18 || Pirates || 1–2 || Lincoln (1–0) || Hudson (1–1) || Cruz (2) || 18,368 || 7–5
|-  style="text-align:center; background: #fbb;"
| 13 || April 19 || Braves || 2–10 || Minor (2–1) || Collmenter (0–1) || || 18,110 || 7–6
|-  style="text-align:center; background: #fbb;"
| 14 || April 20 || Braves || 1–9 || Beachy (2–1) || Cahill (1–1) || || 27,761 || 7–7
|-  style="text-align:center; background: #fbb;"
| 15 || April 21 || Braves || 2–3 || Hanson (2–2) || Saunders (1–1) || Kimbrel (5) || 30,188 || 7–8
|-  style="text-align:center; background: #bfb;"
| 16 || April 22 || Braves || 6–4 || Kennedy (3–0) || Delgado (2–1) || Putz (5) || 28,679 || 8–8
|-  style="text-align:center; background: #bfb;"
| 17 || April 23 || Phillies || 9–5 || Miley (2–0) || Kendrick (0–1) || || 21,195 || 9–8
|-  style="text-align:center; background: #fbb;"
| 18 || April 24 || Phillies || 5–8 || Worley (1–2) || Collmenter (0–2) || Papelbon (6) || 24,213 || 9–9
|-  style="text-align:center; background: #fbb;"
| 19 || April 25 || Phillies || 2–7 || Hamels (3–1) || Cahill (1–2) || || 25,934 || 9–10
|-  style="text-align:center; background: #bfb;"
| 20 || April 27 || @ Marlins || 5–0 || Saunders (2–1)  || Zambrano (0–2) || || 31,949 || 10–10
|-  style="text-align:center; background: #fbb;"
| 21 || April 28 || @ Marlins || 2–3 || Cishek (2–0) || Ziegler (0–1) || || 33,525 || 10–11
|-  style="text-align:center; background: #bfb;"
| 22 || April 29 || @ Marlins || 8–4 || Miley (3–0) || Johnson (0–3) || || 34,918 || 11–11
|-  style="text-align:center; background: #bfb;"
| 23 || April 30 || @ Marlins || 9–5 || Corbin (1–0) || Buehrle (1–4) || || 31,006 || 12–11
|-

|-  style="text-align:center; background: #bfb;"
| 24 || May 1 || @ Nationals || 5–1 || Cahill (2–2) || Zimmermann (1–2) || || 22,675 || 13–11
|-  style="text-align:center; background: #fbb;"
| 25 || May 2 || @ Nationals || 4–5 || Rodríguez (1–1) || Putz (0–2) || || 16,274 || 13–12
|-  style="text-align:center; background: #fbb;"
| 26 || May 3 || @ Nationals || 1–2 || Detwiler (3–1) || Kennedy (3–1) || Rodríguez (6) || 19,656 || 13–13
|-  style="text-align:center; background: #bfb;"
| 27 || May 4 || @ Mets || 5–4 || Ziegler (1–1) || Rauch (3–1) || Putz (6) || 26,995 || 14–13
|-  style="text-align:center; background: #fbb;"
| 28 || May 5 || @ Mets || 3–4 || Santana (1–2) || Corbin (1–1) || Francisco (6) || 30,253 || 14–14
|-  style="text-align:center; background: #fbb;"
| 29 || May 6 || @ Mets || 1–3 || Dickey (4–1) || Cahill (2–3) || Francisco (7) || 29,107 || 14–15
|-  style="text-align:center; background: #fbb;"
| 30 || May 7 || Cardinals || 6–9 || Lynn (6–0) || Saunders (2–2) || Motte (5) || 26,447 || 14–16
|-  style="text-align:center; background: #fbb;"
| 31 || May 8 || Cardinals || 1–6 || Westbrook (4–2) || Kennedy (3–2) || || 30,156 || 14–17
|-  style="text-align:center; background: #fbb;"
| 32 || May 9 || Cardinals || 2–7 || Lohse (5–1) || Miley (3–1) || Motte (6) || 27,710 || 14–18
|-  style="text-align:center; background: #bfb;"
| 33 || May 11 || Giants || 5–1 || Corbin (2–1) || Bumgarner (5–2) || || 35,792 || 15–18
|-  style="text-align:center; background: #fbb;"
| 34 || May 12 || Giants || 2–5 || Cain (2–2) || Cahill (2–4) || Casilla (7) || 31,719 || 15–19
|-  style="text-align:center; background: #fbb;"
| 35 || May 13 || Giants || 3–7 || Zito (2–1) || Saunders (2–3) || || 35,430 || 15–20
|-  style="text-align:center; background: #fbb;"
| 36 || May 14 || @ Dodgers || 1–3 || Kershaw (3–1) || Kennedy (3–3) || Jansen (4) || 24,312 || 15–21
|-  style="text-align:center; background: #bfb;"
| 37 || May 15 || @ Dodgers || 5–1 || Miley (4–1) || Billingsley (2–3) || || 47,077 || 16–21
|-  style="text-align:center; background: #fbb;"
| 38 || May 16 || @ Rockies || 1–6 || Moyer (2–3) || Corbin (2–2) || || 32,162 || 16–22
|-  style="text-align:center; background: #bfb;"
| 39 || May 17 || @ Rockies || 9–7 || Ziegler (2–1) || Betancourt (1–1) || Putz (7) || 32,035 || 17–22
|-  style="text-align:center; background: #bfb;"
| 40 || May 18 || @ Royals || 6–4 || Ziegler (3–1) || Herrera (0–1) || Putz (8) || 33,694 || 18–22
|-  style="text-align:center; background: #fbb;"
| 41 || May 19 || @ Royals || 3–7 || Chen (3–4) || Kennedy (3–4) || || 27,469 || 18–23
|-  style="text-align:center; background: #bfb;"
| 42 || May 20 || @ Royals || 2–0 || Miley (5–1) || Adcock (0–2) || Putz (9) || 24,234 || 19–23
|-  style="text-align:center; background: #fbb;"
| 43 || May 21 || Dodgers || 1–6 || Capuano (6–1) || Corbin (2–3) || || 24,768 || 19–24
|-  style="text-align:center; background: #fbb;"
| 44 || May 22 || Dodgers || 7–8 || Lindblom (2–0) || Putz (0–3) || Jansen (6) || 25,738 || 19–25
|-  style="text-align:center; background: #bfb;"
| 45 || May 23 || Dodgers || 11–4 || Saunders (3–3) || Lilly (5–1) || || 27,645 || 20–25
|-  style="text-align:center; background: #fbb;"
| 46 || May 25 || Brewers || 1–7 || Gallardo (3–4) || Kennedy (3–5) || || 35,478 || 20–26
|-  style="text-align:center; background: #bfb;"
| 47 || May 26 || Brewers || 8–5 || Miley (6–1) || Greinke (5–2) || Putz (10) || 30,184 || 21–26
|-  style="text-align:center; background: #bfb;"
| 48 || May 27 || Brewers || 4–3 || Shaw (1–2) || Veras (3–2) || Putz (11) || 33,481 || 22–26
|-  style="text-align:center; background: #fbb;"
| 49 || May 28 || @ Giants || 2–4 || Zito (4–2) || Cahill (2–5) || Casilla (13) || 42,295 || 22–27
|-  style="text-align:center; background: #fbb;"
| 50 || May 29 || @ Giants || 1–3 || Hensley (2–3) || Shaw (1–3) || Casilla (14) || 41,371 || 22–28
|-  style="text-align:center; background: #bfb;"
| 51 || May 30 || @ Giants || 4–1 || Kennedy (4–5) || Lincecum (2–6) || Hernandez (1) || 41,328 || 23–28
|-

|-  style="text-align:center; background: #fbb;"
| 52 || June 1 || @ Padres || 1–7 || Cashner (3–3) || Miley (6–2) || || 27,054 || 23–29
|-  style="text-align:center; background: #bfb;"
| 53 || June 2 || @ Padres || 4–2 || Hudson (2–1) || Thatcher (0–1) || Putz (12) || 36,559 || 24–29
|-  style="text-align:center; background: #bfb;"
| 54 || June 3 || @ Padres || 6–0 || Cahill (3–5) || Stults (1–2) || || 32,228 || 25–29
|-  style="text-align:center; background: #fbb;"
| 55 || June 4 || Rockies || 0–4 || Friedrich (4–1) || Saunders (3–4) || || 22,881 || 25–30
|-  style="text-align:center; background: #bfb;"
| 56 || June 5 || Rockies || 10–0 || Kennedy (5–5) || Guthrie (3–4) || || 22,322 || 26–30
|-  style="text-align:center; background: #bfb;"
| 57 || June 6 || Rockies || 6–1 || Miley (7–2) || Outman (0–2) || || 23,069 || 27–30
|-  style="text-align:center; background: #bfb;"
| 58 || June 8 || Athletics || 9–8 || Putz (1–3) || Fuentes (2–2) || || 25,787 || 28–30
|-  style="text-align:center; background: #bfb;"
| 59 || June 9 || Athletics || 8–3 || Cahill (4–5) || Parker (2–3) || || 28,061 || 29–30
|-  style="text-align:center; background: #bfb;"
| 60 || June 10 || Athletics || 4–3 || Saunders (4–4) || Blackley (0–2) || Putz (13) || 28,112 || 30–30
|-  style="text-align:center; background: #fbb;"
| 61 || June 12 || @ Rangers || 1–9 || Lewis (5–5) || Kennedy (5–6) || || 39,140 || 30–31
|-  style="text-align:center; background: #fbb;"
| 62 || June 13 || @ Rangers || 0–1 || Adams (1–2) || Miley (7–3) || Nathan (13) || 45,866 || 30–32
|-  style="text-align:center; background: #bfb;"
| 63 || June 14 || @ Rangers || 11–3 || Hudson (3–1) || Feldman (0–6) || || 40,855 || 31–32
|-  style="text-align:center; background: #bfb;"
| 64 || June 15 || @ Angels || 5–0 || Cahill (5–5) || Haren (4–7) || || 37,096 || 32–32
|-  style="text-align:center; background: #fbb;"
| 65 || June 16 || @ Angels || 0–2 || Santana (4–7) || Saunders (4–5) || || 42,483 || 32–33
|-  style="text-align:center; background: #fbb;"
| 66 || June 17 || @ Angels || 0–2 || Richards (2–0) || Kennedy (5–7) || Frieri (7) || 42,222 || 32–34
|-  style="text-align:center; background: #bfb;"
| 67 || June 18 || Mariners || 7–1 || Miley (8–3) || Noesí (2–8) || || 24,284 || 33–34
|-  style="text-align:center; background: #fbb;"
| 68 || June 19 || Mariners || 9–12 (10) || Furbush (3–1) || Putz (1–4) || Wilhelmsen (5) || 21,568 || 33–35
|-  style="text-align:center; background: #bfb;"
| 69 || June 20 || Mariners || 14–10 || Cahill (6–5) || Vargas (7–7) || || 29,630 || 34–35
|-  style="text-align:center; background: #bfb;"
| 70 || June 22 || Cubs || 6–1 || Ziegler (4–1) || Samardzija (5–6) || Hernandez (2) || 34,654 || 35–35
|-  style="text-align:center; background: #bfb;"
| 71 || June 23 || Cubs || 10–5 || Breslow (2–0) || Maholm (4–6) || || 38,542 || 36–35
|-  style="text-align:center; background: #bfb;"
| 72 || June 24 || Cubs || 5–1 || Miley (9–3) || Garza (3–6) || || 33,448 || 37–35
|-  style="text-align:center; background: #fbb;"
| 73 || June 26 || @ Braves || 1–8 || Hudson (6–3) || Hudson (3–2) || || 23,513 || 37–36
|-  style="text-align:center; background: #fbb;"
| 74 || June 27 || @ Braves || 4–6 || Hanson (9–4) || Cahill (6–6) || Kimbrel (22) || 20,039 || 37–37
|-  style="text-align:center; background: #bfb;"
| 75 || June 28 || @ Braves || 3–2 || Hernandez (1–1) || Kimbrel (0–1) || Putz (14) || 21,913 || 38–37
|-  style="text-align:center; background: #bfb;"
| 76 || June 29 || @ Brewers || 9–3 || Kennedy (6–7) || Wolf (2–6) || || 38,030 || 39–37
|-  style="text-align:center; background: #fbb;"
| 77 || June 30 || @ Brewers || 2–10 || Fiers (3–2) || Miley (9–4) || || 41,647 || 39–38
|-

|-  style="text-align:center; background: #fbb;"
| 78 || July 1 || @ Brewers || 1–2 || Axford (2–5) || Corbin (2–4) || || 38,605 || 39–39
|-  style="text-align:center; background: #fbb;"
| 79 || July 2 || Padres || 2–6 || Richard (6–8) || Cahill (6–7) || Thatcher (1) || 19,633 || 39–40
|-  style="text-align:center; background: #fbb;"
| 80 || July 3 || Padres || 5–9 || Ohlendorf (2–0) || Bauer (0–1) || || 21,329 || 39–41
|-  style="text-align:center; background: #fbb;"
| 81 || July 4 || Padres || 6–8 || Gregerson (2–0) || Hernandez (1–2) || Street (13) || 48,819 || 39–42
|-  style="text-align:center; background: #fbb;"
| 82 || July 5 || Dodgers || 1–4 || Eovaldi (1–5) || Miley (9–5) || Jansen (15) || 23,002 || 39–43
|-  style="text-align:center; background: #bfb;"
| 83 || July 6 || Dodgers || 5–3 || Collmenter (1–2) || Kershaw (6–5) || Putz (15) || 24,891 || 40–43
|-  style="text-align:center; background: #bfb;"
| 84 || July 7 || Dodgers || 5–3 || Cahill (7–7) || Billingsley (4–9) || Putz (16) || 36,903 || 41–43
|-  style="text-align:center; background: #bfb;"
| 85 || July 8 || Dodgers || 7–1 || Bauer (1–1) || Capuano (9–4) || Corbin (1) || 30,523 || 42–43
|-  style="text-align:center; background: #fbb;"
| 86 || July 13 || @ Cubs || 1–8 || Maholm (7–6) || Kennedy (6–8) || || 36,878 || 42–44
|-  style="text-align:center; background: #fbb;"
| 87 || July 14 || @ Cubs || 1–4 || Dempster (5–3) || Saunders (4–6) || Mármol (9) || 38,068 || 42–45
|-  style="text-align:center; background: #fbb;"
| 88 || July 15 || @ Cubs || 1–3 || Garza (5–7) || Cahill (7–8) || Mármol (10) || 36,659 || 42–46
|-  style="text-align:center; background: #bfb;"
| 89 || July 16 || @ Reds || 5–3 || Miley (10–5) || Arroyo (4–6) || Putz (17) || 27,735 || 43–46
|-  style="text-align:center; background: #fbb;"
| 90 || July 17 || @ Reds || 0–4 || Cueto (11–5) || Bauer (1–2) || Chapman (14) || 19,142 || 43–47
|-  style="text-align:center; background: #bfb;"
| 91 || July 18 || @ Reds || 7–1 || Kennedy (7–8) || Latos (7–3) || || 26,077 || 44–47
|-  style="text-align:center; background: #fbb;"
| 92 || July 19 || @ Reds || 6–7 || Simón (2–1) || Shaw (1–4) || Chapman (15) || 21,620 || 44–48
|-  style="text-align:center; background: #bfb;"
| 93 || July 20 || Astros || 13–8 || Cahill (8–8) || Norris (5–8) || || 23,567 || 45–48
|-  style="text-align:center; background: #bfb;"
| 94 || July 21 || Astros || 12–3 || Miley (11–5) || Keuchel (1–2) || || 35,665 || 46–48
|-  style="text-align:center; background: #bfb;"
| 95 || July 22 || Astros || 8–2 || Collmenter (2–2) || Lyles (2–7) || || 20,951 || 47–48
|-  style="text-align:center; background: #bfb;"
| 96 || July 23 || Rockies || 6–3 || Kennedy (8–8) || Sánchez (1–7) || Putz (18) || 20,056 || 48–48
|-  style="text-align:center; background: #bfb;"
| 97 || July 24 || Rockies || 6–2 || Saunders (5–6) || Cabrera (0–2) || || 20,432 || 49–48
|-  style="text-align:center; background: #fbb;"
| 98 || July 25 || Rockies || 2–4 || Francis (3–2) || Cahill (8–9) || Betancourt (17) || 23,385 || 49–49
|-  style="text-align:center; background: #fbb;"
| 99 || July 26 || Mets || 1–3 || Harvey (1–0) || Miley (11–6) || Parnell (3) || 22,010 || 49–50
|-  style="text-align:center; background: #bfb;"
| 100 || July 27 || Mets || 11–5 || Collmenter (3–2) || Niese (7–5) || || 23,150 || 50–50
|-  style="text-align:center; background: #bfb;"
| 101 || July 28 || Mets || 6–3 || Kennedy (9–8) || Young (2–5) || Putz (19) || 33,759 || 51–50
|-  style="text-align:center; background: #fbb;"
| 102 || July 29 || Mets || 1–5 || Dickey (14–2) || Saunders (5–7) || || 32,134 || 51–51
|-  style="text-align:center; background: #bfb;"
| 103 || July 30 || @ Dodgers || 7–2 || Cahill (9–9) || Harang (7–6) || || 33,180 || 52–51
|-  style="text-align:center; background: #bfb;"
| 104 || July 31 || @ Dodgers || 8–2 || Miley (12–6) || Capuano (10–7) || || 52,832 || 53–51
|-

|-  style="text-align:center; background: #bfb;"
| 105 || August 1 || @ Dodgers || 4–0 || Corbin (3–4) || Fife (0–1) || || 36,596 || 54–51
|-  style="text-align:center; background: #bfb;"
| 106 || August 3 || @ Phillies || 4–2 || Kennedy (10–8) || Kendrick (4–9) || Putz (20) || 43,766 || 55–51
|-  style="text-align:center; background: #fbb;"
| 107 || August 4 || @ Phillies || 0–3 || Halladay (5–6) || Saunders (5–8) || Papelbon (24) || 43,762 || 55–52
|-  style="text-align:center; background: #fbb;"
| 108 || August 5 || @ Phillies || 4–5 || Papelbon (3–4) || Collmenter (3–3) || || 43,741 || 55–53
|-  style="text-align:center; background: #fbb;"
| 109 || August 6 || @ Pirates || 0–4 || Bédard (6–12) || Miley (12–7) || || 24,213 || 55–54
|-  style="text-align:center; background: #bfb;"
| 110 || August 7 || @ Pirates || 10–4 || Ziegler (5–1) || Grilli (1–4) || || 22,655 || 56–54
|-  style="text-align:center; background: #fbb;"
| 111 || August 8 || @ Pirates || 6–7 || Correia (9–6) || Kennedy (10–9) || Hanrahan (33) || 25,175 || 56–55
|-  style="text-align:center; background: #bfb;"
| 112 || August 9 || @ Pirates || 6–3 || Saunders (6–8) || Rodríguez (7–11) || Putz (21) || 20,558 || 57–55
|-  style="text-align:center; background: #fbb;"
| 113 || August 10 || Nationals || 1–9 || Strasburg (13–5) || Cahill (9–10) || || 29,362 || 57–56
|-  style="text-align:center; background: #fbb;"
| 114 || August 11 || Nationals || 5–6 || Jackson (7–7) || Miley (12–8) || Clippard (24) || 34,030 || 57–57
|-  style="text-align:center; background: #bfb;"
| 115 || August 12 || Nationals || 7–4 || Corbin (4–4) || Detwiler (6–5) || Putz (22) || 27,345 || 58–57
|-  style="text-align:center; background: #fbb;"
| 116 || August 14 || @ Cardinals || 2–8 || Kelly (3–5) || Kennedy (10–10) || || 34,587 || 58–58
|-  style="text-align:center; background: #fbb;"
| 117 || August 15 || @ Cardinals || 2–5 || Wainwright (11–10) || Saunders (6–9) || Motte (27) || 33,572 || 58–59
|-  style="text-align:center; background: #bfb;"
| 118 || August 16 || @ Cardinals || 2–1 || Hernandez (2–2) || Motte (4–4) || Putz (23) || 36,758 || 59–59
|-  style="text-align:center; background: #bfb;"
| 119 || August 17 || @ Astros || 3–1 || Miley (13–8) || Keuchel (1–5) || Putz (24) || 19,223 || 60–59
|-  style="text-align:center; background: #bfb;"
| 120 || August 18 || @ Astros || 12–4 || Corbin (5–4) || Lyles (2–10) || || 20,838 || 61–59
|-  style="text-align:center; background: #bfb;"
| 121 || August 19 || @ Astros || 8–1 || Kennedy (11–10) || Galarraga (0–4) || || 14,923 || 62–59
|-  style="text-align:center; background: #fbb;"
| 122 || August 20 || Marlins || 3–12 || Buehrle (11–11) || Saunders (6–10) || || 17,707 || 62–60
|-  style="text-align:center; background: #fbb;"
| 123 || August 21 || Marlins || 5–6 (10) || Gaudin (2–1) || Demel (0–1) || Cishek (10) || 17,434 || 62–61
|-  style="text-align:center; background: #bfb;"
| 124 || August 22 || Marlins || 3–2 || Skaggs (1–0) || Turner (1–2) || Putz (25) || 17,239 || 63–61
|-  style="text-align:center; background: #bfb;"
| 125 || August 22 || Marlins || 3–0 || Miley (14–8) || LeBlanc (2–3) || Putz (26) || 20,027 || 64–61
|-  style="text-align:center; background: #fbb;"
| 126 || August 24 || Padres || 0–5 || Stults (4–2) || Corbin (5–5) || || 32,726 || 64–62
|-  style="text-align:center; background: #fbb;"
| 127 || August 25 || Padres || 3–9 || Richard (11–12) || Kennedy (11–11) || || 27,619 || 64–63
|-  style="text-align:center; background: #fbb;"
| 128 || August 26 || Padres || 4–5 || Vólquez (9–9) || Cahill (9–11) || Gregerson (1) || 28,172 || 64–64
|-  style="text-align:center; background: #fbb;"
| 129 || August 27 || Reds || 2–3 || Arroyo (11–7) || Skaggs (1–1) || Chapman (32) || 17,966 || 64–65
|-  style="text-align:center; background: #fbb;"
| 130 || August 28 || Reds || 2–5 || Cueto (17–6) || Miley (14–9) || Chapman (33) || 20,550 || 64–66
|-  style="text-align:center; background: #fbb;"
| 131 || August 29 || Reds || 2–6 || Latos (11–4) || Corbin (5–6) || || 18,451 || 64–67
|-  style="text-align:center; background: #bfb;"
| 132 || August 30 || @ Dodgers || 2–0 || Kennedy (12–11) || Kershaw (12–8) || Putz (27) || 54,621 || 65–67
|-  style="text-align:center; background: #bfb;"
| 133 || August 31 || @ Dodgers || 4–3 (11) || Bergesen (1–0) || Guerrier (0–2) || Putz (28) || 37,622 || 66–67
|-

|-  style="text-align:center; background: #fbb;"
| 134 || September 1 || @ Dodgers || 1–2 || Beckett (6–12) || Albers (2–1) || League (10) || 35,992 || 66–68
|-  style="text-align:center; background: #fbb;"
| 135 || September 2 || @ Dodgers || 4–5 || Belisario (4–1) || Putz (1–5) || || 31,607 || 66–69
|-  style="text-align:center; background: #fbb;"
| 136 || September 3 || @ Giants || 8–9 (10) || Romo (4–2) || Shaw (1–5) || || 42,045 || 66–70
|-  style="text-align:center; background: #bfb;"
| 137 || September 4 || @ Giants || 8–6 (11) || Collmenter (4–3) || Kontos (1–1) || || 41,038 || 67–70
|-  style="text-align:center; background: #bfb;"
| 138 || September 5 || @ Giants || 6–2 || Cahill (10–11) || Bumgarner (14–10) || || 41,035 || 68–70
|-  style="text-align:center; background: #fbb;"
| 139 || September 7 || @ Padres || 5–6 || Brach (2–4) || Hernandez (2–3) || Gregerson (5) || 25,403 || 68–71
|-  style="text-align:center; background: #bfb;"
| 140 || September 8 || @ Padres || 8–5 || Miley (15–9) || Kelly (1–1) || Putz (29) || 25,514 || 69–71
|-  style="text-align:center; background: #fbb;"
| 141 || September 9 || @ Padres || 2–8 || Werner (2–1) || Corbin (5–7) || || 21,037 || 69–72
|-  style="text-align:center; background: #bfb;"
| 142 || September 11 || Dodgers || 1–0 || Kennedy (13–11) || Kershaw (12–9) || Hernandez (3) || 23,966 || 70–72
|-  style="text-align:center; background: #bfb;"
| 143 || September 12 || Dodgers || 3–2 || Cahill (11–11) || Harang (9–9) || Hernandez (4) || 25,048 || 71–72
|-  style="text-align:center; background: #fbb;"
| 144 || September 14 || Giants || 2–6 || Cain (14–5) || Skaggs (1–2) || || 31,856 || 71–73
|-  style="text-align:center; background: #fbb;"
| 145 || September 15 || Giants || 2–3 || Zito (12–8) || Miley (15–10) || Romo (11) || 39,169 || 71–74
|-  style="text-align:center; background: #bfb;"
| 146 || September 16 || Giants || 10–2 || Corbin (6–7) || Vogelsong (12–9) || || 29,051 || 72–74
|-  style="text-align:center; background: #bfb;"
| 147 || September 18 || Padres || 3–2 || Kennedy (14–11) || Stults (6–3) || Putz (30) || 20,811 || 73–74
|-  style="text-align:center; background: #bfb;"
| 148 || September 19 || Padres || 6–2 || Cahill (12–11) || Vólquez (10–11) || || 21,013 || 74–74
|-  style="text-align:center; background: #fbb;"
| 149 || September 20 || Padres || 5–6 || Richard (14–12) || Skaggs (1–3) || Bass (1) || 17,821 || 74–75
|-  style="text-align:center; background: #bfb;"
| 150 || September 21 || @ Rockies || 15–5 || Miley (16–10) || White (2–9) || || 42,359 || 75–75
|-  style="text-align:center; background: #bfb;"
| 151 || September 22 || @ Rockies || 8–7 || Bergesen (2–0) || Torres (4–3) || Putz (31) || 33,689 || 76–75
|-  style="text-align:center; background: #bfb;"
| 152 || September 23 || @ Rockies || 10–7 || Albers (3–1) || Belisle (3–8) || Putz (32) || 32,448 || 77–75
|-  style="text-align:center; background: #fbb;"
| 153 || September 24 || @ Rockies || 2–4 || Chatwood (5–5) || Cahill (12–12) || Betancourt (30) || 22,277 || 77–76
|-  style="text-align:center; background: #bfb;"
| 154 || September 25 || @ Giants || 7–2 || Collmenter (5–3) || Lincecum (10–15) || || 41,153 || 78–76
|-  style="text-align:center; background: #fbb;"
| 155 || September 26 || @ Giants || 0–6 || Cain (16–5) || Miley (16–11) || || 41,516 || 78–77
|-  style="text-align:center; background: #fbb;"
| 156 || September 27 || @ Giants || 3–7 || Zito (14–8) || Corbin (6–8) || || 41,128 || 78–78
|-  style="text-align:center; background: #bfb;"
| 157 || September 28 || Cubs || 8–3 || Kennedy (15–11) || Wood (6–13) || || 28,463 || 79–78
|-  style="text-align:center; background: #bfb;"
| 158 || September 29 || Cubs || 8–2 || Cahill (13–12) || Germano (2–10) || || 29,084 || 80–78
|-  style="text-align:center; background: #fbb;"
| 159 || September 30 || Cubs || 2–7 || Rusin (2–3) || Shaw (1–6) || || 35,535 || 80–79
|-

|-  style="text-align:center; background:#fbb;"
| 160 || October 1 || Rockies || 5–7 || Outman (1–3) || Bergesen (2–1) || Roenicke (1) || 24,123 ||80–80
|-  style="text-align:center; background:#bfb;"
| 161 || October 2 || Rockies || 5–3 || Ziegler (6–1) || Betancourt (1–4) || ||22,466 ||81–80
|-  style="text-align:center; background: #fbb;"
| 162 || October 3 || Rockies || 1–2 || Francis (6–7) || Kennedy (15–12) || Belisle (3) || 24,344 || 81–81
|-

Player stats

Batting
Note: G = Games played; AB = At bats; R = Runs scored; H = Hits; 2B = Doubles; 3B = Triples; HR = Home runs; RBI = Runs batted in; SB = Stolen bases; AVG = Batting average

Pitching
Note: W = Wins; L = Losses; ERA = Earned run average; G = Games pitched; GS = Games started; SV = Saves; IP = Innings pitched; H = Hits allowed; R = Runs allowed; ER = Earned runs allowed; BB = Walks allowed; K = Strikeouts

Farm system

League Champions: Reno, Mobile, Missoula

References

External links

 2012 Arizona Diamondbacks season at Baseball Reference
 2012 Arizona Diamondbacks season Official Site

Arizona Diamondbacks seasons
Arizona Diamondbacks
Arizonia